The 2011–12 Botola is the 55th season of the Moroccan Top League, but the 1st under its new format of Moroccan Pro League. It began on Friday 19 August 2011 with Maghreb Fez beating Hassania Agadir 2–0. Raja Casablanca are the holders of the title. Moghreb Tétouan won the 2011–12 Botola, after defeating the runner-up FUS Rabat in the last game of the season at Stade Moulay Abdellah, Rabat. Both teams were pushing for the title until the last game. It was the first time in history of the Botola that a team from the north of the country wins it.

Overview

Stadiums and locations 

Source: Soccerway.com

League table

Season statistics

Top scorers

See also 
2011–12 GNF 2

References

External links 

 Season at soccerway.com
 Botola Pro

Botola seasons
Morocco
1